Norbert Neuser is a German teacher and politician of the Social Democratic Party (SPD) who served as a Member of the European Parliament from 2009 to 2022. In late 2021, he announced his decision to resign from parliament by January 2022.

References

External links

Living people
MEPs for Germany 2009–2014
MEPs for Germany 2014–2019
MEPs for Germany 2019–2024
Social Democratic Party of Germany MEPs
Year of birth missing (living people)